Charles Edward Brown (October 26, 1928 – August 2, 2007) was an American professional football player who was a quarterback and punter in the National Football League (NFL).

Prior to the NFL
Brown went to high school in San Luis Obispo, California, and Hartnell College in Salinas, California. He played for the University of San Francisco Dons through 1951. On his senior year (1951), he quarterbacked the Dons to an undefeated 9–0 season, but the team did not receive a Bowl invitation. Despite the increasing integration of college and pro football, the major bowls that year did not select teams that had black players, or they asked the teams to not bring their black players. The Dons refused to send a white-only squad, so they were snubbed. The 1951 Dons featured Ollie Matson and Burl Toler, both superb players who happened to be African-American. Matson played with great success in the NFL and made the Pro Football Hall of Fame. Toler went on to become the first black official in the NFL. The 1951 Dons are sometimes considered the greatest collection of players ever on one college team. Besides Matson, Toler, and Brown, the Dons had Gino Marchetti, Bob St. Clair, Dick Stanfel, and five other players who made the NFL. In addition, the Dons head coach Joe Kuharich went on to coach in the NFL, and their athletic news director (publicist) was Pete Rozelle, future NFL commissioner. Despite their great success -- or maybe it was because of it -- USF discontinued its football program after the 1951 season due to the high cost of running a top-notch football team.

NFL career

Chicago Bears years
Brown was drafted by George Halas' Chicago Bears in the sixth round of the 1952 NFL Draft. But Brown was drafted by the Marines and spent two years in service. He did play for the Camp Pendleton football squad. Brown began playing in 1954 as the third string quarterback for the Bears, behind George Blanda and Zeke Bratkowski. In 1955, with Bratkowski in the military, Brown beat out Blanda for the starting job and led the Bears to an 8–4 record and a very close second-place finish to the Los Angeles Rams. Brown developed a reputation as a longball-throwing, shot-and-a-beer quarterback, connecting often with Harlon Hill, who led the league with nine touchdown receptions. Brown had his finest season in 1956, playing for new Bears' head coach Paddy Driscoll (Halas was still owner and GM and would soon return as coach). Brown led the league that year in passing, completing 96 of 168 passes for 1,667 yards, 11 touchdowns and 12 interceptions. He had an amazing 9.9 yards per attempt. Hill remained his favorite target, catching 47 passes for 1,128 yards (a 24.0 yard per catch average), and 11 touchdowns. The Bears won the Western Conference with a 9-2-1 record, leading the league in rushing and scoring while finished second in rushing in rushing defense. 

The Bears met the New York Giants in the 1956 Championship Game on December 30 at Yankee Stadium. The 1956 game was the second "sneakers" game in Bears-Giants history (the first was in 1934), with the Giants again gaining an advantage by switching to sneakers vice cleats on an icy field. The Giants destroyed the Bears 47–7, intercepting Brown twice, sacking him multiple times for -34 yards and shutting down Rick Casares and the Bears' running attack. The Bears completed 20 of 47 passes for only 247 yards and no touchdowns. It got so bad that the Bears abandoned the T-formation and switched to a single-wing variant in the third quarter. 

In 1957, the Bears appeared to still be affected by the 1956 title game, slumping to 5–7 with an anemic running attack and a mediocre year by Ed Brown. All of Brown's numbers were down from the previous season. Zeke Bratkowski got back from military service and began to challenge Brown for the quarterback job. In 1958, George Halas took back the coaching job and pushed the Bears back into second place at 8–4, one game behind the Baltimore Colts. Brown played better, throwing for 1,418 yards and 10 touchdowns. Brown had another productive season in 1959, when the Bears again finished second behind Baltimore with an 8–4 record. He passed for a career-high 1,881 yards and 13 touchdowns. By 1960, Brown began decline on the field while his many late nights didn't sit well with Halas, so Bratkowski got more and more playing time. Brown completed only 40% of his passes that year as the Bears finished in fifth. In 1961, Brown was benched in favor of newly acquired Billy Wade. Throughout his years with the Bears (except 1961), Brown was their starting punter, leading the league in punts attempted in 1959 with 64.

With the Steelers 
Before the 1962 season, Brown was traded to the Pittsburgh Steelers, with whom he remained a back-up, now to future Hall of Famer Bobby Layne. Brown got another chance to start when Layne retired after the season. In 1963, still specializing in the long passes, he had his biggest numbers, completing 168 of 362 passes for 2,982 yards, 21 touchdowns, and 20 interceptions. To the surprise of many, the Steelers stayed in contention for the East title until the final game of the season, in which Brown played poorly in a 33–17 loss to the Giants in New York.

In 1964, Brown played his last year as a starter, throwing for 1,990 yards for the mediocre Steelers team. He played one more season as a backup, was waived and picked up by Baltimore late in the season. Brown played in the season finale behind running back Tom Matte who was filling in at quarterback after injuries to both Johnny Unitas and Gary Cuozzo. Brown completed 3-of-5 passes, including an 81-yard touchdown. Because of his arrival so late in the season, he was ineligible for the Colts' playoff loss to the eventual champion Green Bay. Brown retired after the season.

Brown finished with 949 completions, 1,987 attempts, 15,600 yards, 102 touchdown passes, and 138 interceptions. He rushed for 960 yards and 14 touchdowns during his career. Brown also punted each year for the Steelers except his last. Brown finished with 498 punts and a 40.5 yard average per kick.

Death
Brown died on August 2, 2007, in Kennewick, Washington of prostate cancer.

References

External links

1928 births
2007 deaths
People from San Luis Obispo, California
Players of American football from California
American football quarterbacks
San Francisco Dons football players
Chicago Bears players
Pittsburgh Steelers players
Western Conference Pro Bowl players
Baltimore Colts players
Deaths from prostate cancer
Deaths from cancer in Washington (state)
Hartnell College alumni
United States Marines